Anders Eriksson (born 19 April 1965) is a Finnish former football player. He played as a defender, and was capped 15 times for Finland scoring one goal.

Eriksson played for FF Jaro, KPV, RoPS and FC Inter at the first tier in Finland. He also played in the Norwegian First Division with Bryne and Lyn, and in Allsvenskan with Östers IF. Eriksson played for Lyn in the 1994 Norwegian Football Cup final, and became the first Finnish player to play in a Norwegian Football Cup final.

References

External links
 Veikkausliiga Legendat
 Veikkausliiga Hall of Fame
 Finnish players abroad

1965 births
Living people
Finnish footballers
Finland international footballers
FF Jaro players
Kuopion Palloseura players
Rovaniemen Palloseura players
Bryne FK players
Lyn Fotball players
Östers IF players
FC Inter Turku players
Veikkausliiga players
Norwegian First Division players
Allsvenskan players
Finnish expatriate footballers
Expatriate footballers in Sweden
Expatriate footballers in Norway
IFK Mariehamn players
Association football defenders
People from Mariehamn
Sportspeople from Åland